The Breginj Combe is a valley in extreme western Slovenia. It lies between the elongated ridge of Mount Stol to the north and Mount Mia to the south. To the east it expands into the broad Staro Selo Lowland (Staroselsko podolje), and to the west it meets the border with Italy. The Slovenian–Italian border runs along the Nadiža/Natisone River and its tributary, Black Creek.

The Breginj Combe includes the villages of Borjana, Kred, Potoki, Podbela, Breginj, Stanovišče, Homec, Robidišče, Sedlo, and Logje.

The Breginj Combe is part of the cultural region of Venetian Slovenia. The heritage of the region include ethnographic monuments, especially architectural heritage, which was extensively damaged by the 1976 Friuli earthquake. Some of this heritage is preserved in the Breginj Museum in Breginj.

Popular tourism destinations in the Breginj Combe include the Napoleon Bridge in Logje and the village of Robidišče, which is the westernmost settlement in Slovenia. The Nadiža River is warm during the summers and popular for swimming.

References

External links
 The Breginj Combe at Geopedia

Valleys in the Slovene Littoral
Municipality of Kobarid